Exeter Airport , formerly Exeter International Airport, is an international airport located at Clyst Honiton in East Devon, close to the city of Exeter and within the county of Devon, South West England. Exeter has a CAA Public Use Aerodrome Licence (Number P759) that allows flights for the public transport of passengers or for flying instruction. The airport offers both scheduled and holiday charter flights within the United Kingdom and Europe.

In 2007, the airport handled over 1 million passengers per year for the first time, although passenger throughput subsequently declined, recovering to 931,000 passengers in 2018. In 2019, passenger numbers once again passed the 1 million mark, due in part to Ryanair operating several new flights to/from the airport. Prior to its collapse in 2020, the airline Flybe accounted for over 80% of the airport's passenger numbers. Passenger numbers declined sharply to 148,000 in 2020.

Location
The M5 enables links to Bristol and the Midlands. There is no railway station at the airport. The closest, Cranbrook, is  miles away by road. There is also a bus link to Exeter St Davids railway station.

History
Exeter Airport was situated on land acquired by Exeter Corporation by compulsory purchase. It was leased and operated by Straight Corporation who also set up the Exeter Aero Club. The airfield officially opened on 31 May 1937 and operated from a "tented" terminal before the permanent buildings were complete. Jersey Airways immediately inaugurated a summer service of eight flights per week from Jersey in de Havilland DH.84 Dragons. Railway Air Services ran connecting flights on to Plymouth and Bristol.

Wartime use

In World War II, RAF Exeter was an important RAF Fighter Command airfield during the Battle of Britain. RAF Exeter was used by the United States Army Air Forces (USAAF) Ninth Air Force as a D-Day troop transport base with Douglas C-47 Skytrain transports dropping paratroops near Carentan to land on the Normandy Beachhead. It was known as USAAF Station AAF-463.

Two brass plaques on the wall near the airport's observation lounge commemorate the activities of 3 squadrons of the Polish Air Forces in France and Great Britain that were based at Exeter during World War II, and commend their actions in defence of the city of Exeter.

Battle of Britain
RAF Exeter was home to the following Squadrons of No 10 Group during the Battle of Britain:

 No. 213 Squadron from 18 June 1940
 No. 87 Squadron from 5 July 1940
 No. 601 Squadron from 7 September 1940

Despite efforts at camouflage, including painting the runways, Exeter attracted the Luftwaffe and administrative and technical buildings were destroyed.

USAAF use
Exeter met the requirement of basing USAAF troop carrier groups close to where units of the 101st Airborne Division were located and within reasonable range of the expected area of operations.

440th Troop Carrier Group

The 440th Troop Carrier Group arrived on 15 April 1944, with over 70 C-47/C-53 Skytrain aircraft. There was insufficient hardstandings to accommodate all the aircraft so many had to be parked on the turf, some areas being supported by tarmac. The 440th was a group of Ninth Air Force's 50th Troop Carrier Wing, IX Troop Carrier Command.  The 98th TCS remained at Exeter until 7 August, when it began operating from RAF Ramsbury. On 11 September, the headquarters of the 440th TCG was established at the group's new base at Reims, France (ALG A-62D), and the last of the air echelon left Exeter two days later.

Postwar use
Walruses of an RAF air-sea rescue flight were the next tenants and these were joined by a glider training unit early in 1945.
Post-war, Exeter was reclaimed by Fighter Command and a French Supermarine Spitfire squadron, No. 329, which came and stayed until November 1945. Meteors and Mosquitos made a brief appearance the following spring. No. 691 Squadron's target-towing Vultee A-31 Vengeances, which had been present for more than a year, proved to be the last RAF flying unit of the Second World War period based at Exeter. When No. 691 Squadron departed in the summer of 1946, the station was made available for civil use, being officially transferred to the Ministry of Civil Aviation on 1 January 1947, although there was still some reserve RAF activity until the 1950s.

Scheduled services to the Channel Islands began in 1952 and charter flights to various locations followed. A new terminal building was opened in the early 1980s and various other improvements, including a runway extension, were carried out over following years to establish Exeter as an important airport in the West Country. Exeter was a joint RAF/Civil airfield in the 1960s.

On 5 January 2007, a majority share of the airport was sold by Devon County Council to Regional and City Airports Ltd, a consortium led by construction firm Balfour Beatty. On 26 June 2013, the airport was bought by the Patriot Aerospace division of Rigby Group, which also owns Coventry Airport.

In August 2016, Exeter Airport recorded their highest passenger throughput in a single month since September 2008, with 100,374 passengers passing through its terminal. New services to Glasgow and the first route to be supported by the new Government Regional Air Connectivity fund to Norwich, contributed to a 19% increase in passenger numbers during the month of August. During 2018, the runway was resurfaced and energy-efficient LED lighting installed.

In 2019, the airport was ranked fourth in the UK by Which? magazine of 30 airports for customer satisfaction, with a score of 73%.

Accidents

On 19 January 2021, a West Atlantic Boeing 737-400 freighter having just performed flight NPT05L from East Midlands Airport made a very hard landing at Exeter Airport, causing multiple creases in the fuselage. The aircraft was written off.

Airlines and destinations
The following airlines operate regular scheduled flights to and from Exeter:

Other users
 Corporate aviation services including a private lounge are provided by XLR Executive Jet Centre
There is one flight training organisation based at the airport: Aviation South West, which offers a range of training from the Private Pilot Licence to the Commercial Pilots Licence and Instrument Rating.
Dublin Aerospace operates the Exeter Aerospace hangar which provides base maintenance services on multiple aircraft, such as: ATR 42 family; Bombardier DHC - 8 Family; & Embraer EJR 170 & 190 Series aircraft.
 Iscavia Ltd is based in Hangar 49, on the North-Side of Exeter Airport and provides aircraft maintenance, avionics, airworthiness certification, hangarage, aircraft parts, help and advice.
 Devon Air Ambulance and National Police Air Service (NPAS) share a purpose built facility on the northern side of the airfield, having vacated the police headquarters at Middlemoor, Exeter in 2014.

Statistics

The 25 busiest routes by air passenger numbers are listed below.  many of these routes, which were operated by Flybe, are no longer in operation.

See also
 List of Royal Air Force stations
 List of former Royal Air Force stations
 South West Aviation

References

 Freeman, Roger A. (1978) Airfields of the Eighth: Then and Now. After the Battle 
 Maurer, Maurer (1983). Air Force Combat Units of World War II. Maxwell AFB, Alabama: Office of Air Force History. .

External links
 
 

Airports in Devon
Buildings and structures in Exeter
Airfields of the United States Army Air Forces Air Transport Command in the European Theater
Airfields of the IX Troop Carrier Command in the United Kingdom
Transport in Exeter